Canonical Book of the Tang Dynasty may refer to one of the two canonical history books about the Tang Dynasty:
First Canonical Book of the Tang Dynasty 《舊唐書》, compiled under Liu Xu (劉昫) in 945
Second Canonical Book of the Tang Dynasty 《新唐書》, compiled under Ouyang Xiu (歐陽修) and Song Qi (宋祁) in 1060

See also
 Tang Huiyao, the Institutional History of Tang
 Book of Tang (disambiguation)